Vića is a village in Centar municipality, in town of  Sarajevo, Federation of Bosnia and Herzegovina, Bosnia and Herzegovina.

Demographics

Ethnic composition, 1991 census

total: 5

 Serbs - 5 (100%)

According to the 2013 census, its population was 5.

References

Populated places in Centar, Sarajevo